David Newman may refer to:

Entertainment
David "Fathead" Newman (1933–2009), American jazz saxophonist
David Newman (screenwriter) (1937–2003), American screenwriter
David Newman (composer) (born 1954), American composer
David Newman (singer) (born 1963), aka Durga Das, American singer/songwriter

Sports
Dave Newman (footballer) (1923–1995), Australian footballer for Melbourne
Dave Newman (Canadian football) (born 1956), former Canadian Football League wide receiver

Other
David Newman (politician) (born 1944), Canadian politician
David Newman (priest) (born 1954), Archdeacon of Loughborough since 2009
David Newman (political geographer) (born 1956), British/Israeli political geographer
David Newman (physicist), physicist at the University of Alaska Fairbanks

See also
Dave Neumann (born 1941), Ontario politician